Bangladesh Islami Chhatrashibir, is an Islamic student organization based in Bangladesh. It was established on 06 February 1977. The organisation is generally understood to be the student wing of Bangladesh Jamaat-e-Islami, and several of the leaders of the student organisation have gone on to become notable leaders within Jamaat. The organisation has a significant presence in higher educational institutions of the country such as University of Dhaka, University of Chittagong, Rajshahi University, SUST, BUET, DUET, Medical College. Recently however, the student Organisation has been under pressure from the Bangladesh government led by the ruling party Awami League and its student wing, the Bangladesh Chhatra League.

History 
Bangladesh Islami Chhatrashibir was established on 6 February 1977 at the Dhaka University central mosque. Their stated mission is "to seek the pleasure of Allah (SWT) by moulding entire human life in accordance with the code, bestowed by Allah (SWT) and exemplified by His Messenger".

Overview
According to the group's policy, their activities are guided by five principles:
 Dawah (Calling towards Allah) - Conveying the message of Islam to the students and inspiring them to acquire knowledge and to arouse in them the sense of responsibility to practice Islam in full.
 Organization - To organize the students who are ready to partake in the struggle for establishing the Islamic way of life within the fold of this organization.
 Training - To take appropriate steps to impart Islamic knowledge among the students integrated under the organization to make them men of character, capable of braving the challenges of Jahilyah and, thus, to prove the superiority of Islam.
 Islamic Education Movement and Student-oriented Problems - To struggle for changing the existing system of education on the basis of Islamic values to build up ideal citizens and enhance leadership to solve real problems of the students.
 Establishing Islamic Social Order - To strive tooth-and-nail to establish Islamic social order for freeing humanity from all forms of economic exploitation, political oppression and cultural servitude.

Funding 
Shibir members, who are students of many educational institutions areas are expected to donate monthly in the name of baitul maal (the party fund). There are also several publications that it sells in educational institutions.

Controversy

Bangladesh Liberation War
In 1971, Shibir's predecessor, Islami Chattra Shangha, members of which led the formation of Al-Badr, which was involved in the 1971 killing of Bengali intellectuals; some members of Al-Badr had been convicted and executed by International Crimes Tribunal.

Politically motivated attacks
This student group was also involved in violent clashes with other student groups, was extremely militant and was linked to rumour numerous acts. The group was linked to a number of larger terrorist organizations, both in Bangladesh and internationally. Shibir activists are known to attack rival political party members by cutting their opponents' tendons.

Armed group designation
In February 2014, US-based defense think tank IHS Jane's published a report titled "IHS Jane's 2013 Global Terrorism & Insurgency Attack Index", where Shibir ranked third in a list of most active non-state armed groups in 2013. The organisation protested the study findings, strongly condemning the ranking.

Victims of enforced disappearance
On 5 February 2012 approximately at 1:00a.m. Al Mukaddas (22), fourth-year student of the Department of Al Fiqah and Mohammad Waliullah (23), a Masters candidate of Dawah and Islamic Studies Department of Islamic University, Bangladesh were allegedly arrested and disappeared by some persons who identified themselves as RAB-4 and DB Police members from Savar.
 
Both were members of the Islamic student organization Bangladesh Islami Chhatra Shibir and were allegedly detained by members of the RAB and the Detective Branch (DB) of the Bangladesh Police on 4 February. They have not been heard from since and their whereabouts are unknown. The RAB has denied detaining the two men in a statement to a Bangladeshi newspaper. However, reports from several sources and a pattern of disappearances thought to have been conducted by RAB in recent months cast doubt on RAB's denial. Amnesty International along with other rights organizations expressed their concern over this issue and called for urgent action

On 5 April 2013 at around 2:25am, members of Rapid Action Battalion-5 arrested Mr. Mohammad Anwarul Islam and Mosammat Nurjahan Begum of Angariapara village in Chapainawabganj from house number 175 of Bil-Shimla Moholla under Rajpara Police Station in Rajshahi district. Later, when family members contacted the RAB-5 office, RAB notified that Anwarul had never been arrested by them. An allegation of enforced disappearance was brought against the members of RAB by Anwarul's family members. Upon inquiry, it was found that Anwarul was a last year Master's student of Mathematics department of Rajshahi College. Moreover, he was the Office Secretary of the Islami Chattra Shibir of Rajshahi district.

Crackdowns

Since 2010, Shibir has been targeted by repeated crackdowns. The Awami League led government insists that it is necessary to maintain public order and stop attacks on police, but Amnesty International sees them as political crackdowns. Since 2010, raids on student residences have been carried out at random and any Shibir supporters found there have been detained. In 2010 Government agencies received orders to conduct operations necessary to identify Shibir elements in educational institutions all around Bangladesh and uproot their influence. Arbitrary arrests as police have made no efforts at the time of arrest to separate ordinary student members of the Chhatra Shibir from those suspected of involvement in the attacks and were denied Legal counsel. On 4 November 2018 Bangladesh police raided at the chittagong city headquarter of Bangladesh Islami Chattra Shibir and later filed case against 90 Chittagong Shibir men over explosives recovery. It was the biggest police crackdowns against Shibir in recent times. Although the organization denied any link to the incident and protested strongly against the case.

See also 
 Asian Federation of Muslim Youth
 World Assembly of Muslim Youth
 International Islamic Federation of Student Organizations

References

External links 
 

1977 establishments in Bangladesh
Student organisations in Bangladesh
Student wings of conservative parties
Student wings of political parties in Bangladesh
Islamic organisations based in Bangladesh
Student organizations established in 1977